Langthil Gewog (Dzongkha: གླང་མཐིལ་) is a gewog (village block) of Trongsa District, Bhutan.

References 

Gewogs of Bhutan
Trongsa District